Norman Charles Jones (9 December 1923 – 19 October 1995) was a Canadian-Bermudian sports figure of the 1950s and 1960s, known for participating in sailing events. A native of Calgary, Alberta, Jones represented Bermuda at the 1960 Summer Olympics.

References

External links
Norman Jones' profile at Sports Reference.com

1923 births
1995 deaths
Bermudian male sailors (sport)
Canadian male sailors (sport)
Olympic sailors of Bermuda
Canadian emigrants to Bermuda
Sportspeople from Calgary
Sailors at the 1960 Summer Olympics – 5.5 Metre